The 2000 Columbia Lions football team was an American football team that represented Columbia University during the 2000 NCAA Division I-AA football season. Columbia tied for second-to-last in the Ivy League. 

In their 12th season under head coach Ray Tellier, the Lions compiled a 3–7 record and were outscored 302 to 256. Jason Pease and Avery Moseley were the team captains.  

The Lions' 1–6 conference record tied for worst in the Ivy League standings, though both they and Dartmouth are shown as tied for sixth, as 4–3 Brown was excluded from the championship and recorded as finishing last. Columbia was outscored 246 to 156 by Ivy opponents. 

Columbia played its homes games at Lawrence A. Wien Stadium in Upper Manhattan, in New York City.

Schedule

References

Columbia
Columbia Lions football seasons
Columbia Lions football